The 2016 Georgia Democratic presidential primary took place on March 1 in the U.S. state of Georgia as one of the Democratic Party's primaries ahead of the 2016 presidential election. The primary was an open one.

On the same day, dubbed "Super Tuesday," Democratic primaries were held in ten other states plus American Samoa, while the Republican Party held primaries in eleven states including their own Georgia primary.

Clinton won every county in the state except for Echols County. She easily won Georgia in the primary by a wide margin of victory 43.10%. In 2008, Clinton lost the Georgia primary to then-senator from Illinois Barack Obama.

Clinton's overwhelming win was attributed mostly to the African American vote, and her endorsement from Civil Rights icon Congressman John Lewis.

Opinion polling

Results

Primary date: March 1, 2016
National delegates: 60

Results by county

Analysis 
After losing in Georgia by 36 points to Barack Obama in 2008, Hillary Clinton bounced back with a lopsided 43-point win against rival Bernie Sanders. The victory was fueled primarily by African American voters, who comprised 51% of the electorate and backed Clinton by a margin of 85-14, compared to white voters who backed Clinton by a margin of 58-41. Clinton won across all income levels and educational attainment levels in the Peach State.

Clinton performed extremely well throughout the state of Georgia and won all of its counties but one. She ran particularly strongly in Atlanta where she won 74 percent of the vote as well as its suburbs which backed her 66-34. Central Georgia, particularly the region known as the Cotton Belt which has a large African American population, also strongly favored Clinton by a margin of 79-19. Clinton also performed well in North Georgia, mostly in the more rural, white and conservative parts of the state which are considered to be an extreme part of Appalachia where she defeated Sanders by a margin of 64-36.

After his landslide defeat, the Sanders campaign reported that Hillary Clinton had notched wins in southern states including Georgia because Bernie Sanders did not compete with her, although this claim was disputed.[6]

References

Georgia
Democratic primary
2016